Paul Le Blanc (born 1947) is an American historian at La Roche University in Pittsburgh as well as labor and socialist activist who has written or edited more than 30 books on topics such as Leon Trotsky and Rosa Luxemburg.

Background

Paul Joseph Le Blanc was born in 1947 in Huntingdon, Pennsylvania and spent his childhood in Clearfield, Pennsylvania.  His parents Gaston Le Blanc and Shirley Harris were labor activists; he has two sisters.

Le Blanc studied at the University of Pittsburgh, focusing on history and receiving a Bachelor of Arts degree in 1971, a Master of Arts degree in 1980, and a Doctor of Philosophy degree in 1989.

Career 

In 1965, Le Blanc joined the “New Left” group Students for a Democratic Society (SDS).  In 1966, as a conscientious objector, he worked for the Quaker-based American Friends Service Committee in Pittsburgh and Baltimore.  In the early 1970s, he served on the board of the Pittsburgh Peace and Freedom Center and the coordinating committee of the National Peace Action Coalition (1971-1974).  He opposed the Vietnam war and supported anti-racist activity – most prominently as part of the Pittsburgh Black Construction Coalition of 1969 – pro-feminist activities, defense of Latin American political prisoners, and Central America solidarity work.

In the 1990s, he became active in the Thomas Merton Center (Pittsburgh).  He has been a member of the Socialist Workers Party (USA), the Fourth Internationalist Tendency, Solidarity (United States), and the International Socialist Organization (until it terminated in 2019). He was active in efforts to create a Labor Party. He is a member of the Democratic Socialists of America.

Since 2000, Le Blanc has supported the Green Party.  He has opposed war and militarism, including US military intervention in Iraq and Afghanistan.  He also collaborated closely with South African poet and global justice activist Dennis Brutus in building Pittsburgh participation in World Social Forums taking place in Porto Alegre, Brazil, in 2003 and Mumbai, India, in 2004.

In 2000, Le Blanc joined the faculty of La Roche College (renamed La Roche University in March 2019) as Dean of the School of Arts and Sciences (2003-2009) and as a professor of history.

He has lectured for the International Institute for Research and Education and the Rosa Luxemburg Foundation and writes for the Center for Economic Research and Social Change's  International Socialist Review.

Personal life

Le Blanc married and had two sons.

Le Blanc is currently a member of:
 Pittsburghers for Public Transit
 Thomas Merton Center (Pittsburgh)

He has been a member of: 
 American Association of University Professors
 American Historical Association
 International Socialist Organization
 Organization of American Historians

Influences

Le Blanc's influences include: David Montgomery, Philip S. Foner, Frank Lovell, Richard N. Hunt, Paul Sweezy, George Breitman, Ernest Mandel, and Michael Löwy.

Works
 
Magazines and journals to which he contributes include: 
 Dialectical Anthropology
 Green Left Weekly 
 International Socialism 
  International Socialist Review
 International Viewpoint 
 Russian Review
 Jacobin
 Monthly Review
 New Formations: A Journal of Culture, Theory and Politics
 Socialist Worker

 WorkingUSA: The Journal of Labor and Society

Publications include: 
 1984:  
 Permanent Revolution in Nicaragua
 In Defense of Revolutionary Continuity
 1988: "Reflections on the Fourth Internationalist Tendency"
 1990: Lenin and the Revolutionary Party
 1992:  In Defense of American Trotskyism: Revolutionary Principles and Working-Class Democracy
 1994: C.L.R. James and Revolutionary Marxism
 1996: 
 Trotskyism in the United States: Historical Essays and Reconsiderations (with George Breitman and Alan M. Wald)
 From Marx to Gramsci (edited with major introductory essay)
 "Letter to the Editors" in Solidarity  
 1999: 
 A Short History of the U.S. Working Class
 Rosa Luxemburg: Reflections and Writings (edited with major introductory essay)
 2000: 
 Revolutionary Labor Socialist: The Life, Ideas and Comrades of Frank Lovell
 U.S. Labor in the Twentieth Century (edited with John Hinshaw)
 The Working-Class Movement in America, by Eleanor Marx and Edward Aveling (edited with introductory essay) 
 2003: Black Liberation and the American Dream (edited with major introductory essay)
 2006: Marx, Lenin, and the Revolutionary Experience: Studies of Communism and Radicalism in the Age of Globalization
 2008: 
 Lenin: Revolution, Democracy, Socialism: Selected Writings (edited with introductory essay)
 "History on the Printed Page" in Solidarity  
 "Reluctant Memoir, Part 2" in Solidarity  
 "Does Lenin Still Matter?" in International Socialist Review  
 2009: International Encyclopedia of Revolution and Protest
 2011: 
 Work and Struggle: Voices from U.S. Labor Radicalism (edited with introductory essays)
 Socialism or Barbarism: Selected Writings of Rosa Luxemburg (co-ed. with Helen C. Scott) 
 "Lenin’s Marxism"  
 2012: Leon Trotsky: Writings From Exile (co-edited with Kunal Chattopadhyay)
 2013:  A Freedom Budget for All Americans: Recapturing the Promise of the Civil Rights Movement in the Struggle for Economic Justice Today (with Michael D. Yates)
 2014: 
 Unfinished Leninism: The Rise and Return of a Revolutionary Doctrine
Leon Trotsky and the Organizational Principles of the Revolutionary Party (with Dianne Feeley and Thomas Twiss)
 The "American Exceptionalism of Jay Lovestone and His Comrades, 1929-1940 (co-ed. with Tim Davenport)
 
 2014: "The Third American Revolution" in Imagine: Living in a Socialist USA(
 2015: Leon Trotsky
 2016: The Complete Works of Rosa Luxemburg, Volume II:  Economic Writings 2
 2017:  
 Rosa Remix
 October Song: Bolshevik Triumph, Communist Tragedy, 1917-1924
 October 1917: Workers in Power
 Left Americana: The Radical Heart of US History
 "The ‘American Exceptionalism’ of Jay Lovestone and His Comrades, 1929-1940" in Dissident Marxism in the United States, Volume I
 2018:  
 US Trotskyism 1928–1965, Part I: Emergence
 US Trotskyism 1928–1965, Part II: Endurance
 Revolutionary Studies: Essays in Plain Marxism
 2019: 
Living Flame:  The Revolutionary Passion of Rosa Luxemburg
 US Trotskyism 1928–1965, Part III: Resurgence

References

External links
 Michael D. Yates, "Interview with Paul Le Blanc," Monthly Review online, Aug. 28, 2006
 ResearchGate.net - Paul Le Blanc

1947 births
Living people
20th-century American historians
American male non-fiction writers
21st-century American historians
21st-century American male writers
University of Pittsburgh alumni
American activists
Members of the International Socialist Organization
Members of the Democratic Socialists of America
20th-century American male writers